Arman Abrahimzadeh  is an Iranian-Australian anti-domestic violence campaigner based in Adelaide, South Australia, co-founder of Zahra Foundation Australia .

Biography
Abrahimzadeh and his family migrated to Australia from Iran in 1997. His father was a lawyer and his mother was a housewife.

Along with his sisters, Atena and Anita, and their mother Zahra, he lived in an abusive home and in constant fear that their father, Ziaolleh, would harm or kill them.

In 2009, they were forced to flee their family home, becoming homeless before being referred to domestic violence shelters. After 12 months of threats and stalking, on 21 March 2010, Abrahimzadeh's father Zialloh finally carried out his threat and killed his mother Zahra, during Persian New Year celebrations at the Adelaide Convention Centre, in front of hundreds of witnesses.

Advocacy
Abrahimzadeh, along with his sisters, Atena and Anita, founded Zahra Foundation Australia in 2015 to support victims of domestic violence, including Indigenous family violence, and to create opportunities for economic empowerment. 

Abrahimzadeh has been a key influential figure in shaping public policies and changes in legislation in relation to domestic violence in South Australia. He regularly speaks at forums discussing family violence and gender equality, and he is involved with a number of not-for-profit groups in this sector.

He has appeared on the current affairs series 7.30 on the ABC Television.

He is an ambassador for the White Ribbon Campaign in Australia and Our Watch.

Recognition
He has been named 2015 Allan Sloane Young Citizen of The Year, 2016 Young Australian of the Year for South Australia, and the 2017 City of Charles Sturt Young Citizen of The Year.

He was awarded a Medal of the Order of Australia in June 2018.

Other roles
He is a former Australian representative in taekwondo, and works in design and construction.

Awards

Legacy of Zahra's death

The Women's Domestic Violence Court Assistance Service (WDVCAS) was established in July 2015, as a response to the coronial inquest into the murder of Zahra. Funded for two years by the victims of crime levy, the services provide information, legal advice, support and representation relating to intervention order. The service is accessible via Victim Support Services in Adelaide, Port Lincoln, Mount Gambier, Whyalla, Port Augusta, Port Pirie and Berri. The service won the 2021 Law Society of South Australia Justice Award, and continues to operate.

References

Year of birth missing (living people)
Living people
Anti-domestic violence activists
Recipients of the Medal of the Order of Australia
Iranian emigrants to Australia